The Lemro originally called Aizannadi is a river of Myanmar flowing through Chin State and Rakhine State. It flows into the Bay of Bengal east of Sittwe. The name of the river was given after establishment of four kingdom cities of Arakanese people between the eight and thirteen centuries along the river bank. The Lemro valley is noted for its rock art from these settlers.

History 
Originally called 'Azinnandi River'  
before it was named after establishment of four kingdom cities that ruled Arakan  from 9th century to until 15th century. 

Pyinsa - 1018

Parein - 1102

Hkrit - 1137

Launggyet - 1237

Etymology
In the term of "Lemro," the first term "Le" or "Lay" refers to counting number of "4" and the second term "Mro" refers to "town or city." Lay Mro in the Rakhine language means "four cities," which refers to the four ancient Arakanese cities that flourished by the side of the river.Now we can call "Laymyo" instead of Lemro

Physiography

Sources
Lémro river originates from the mountains and hills of Chin Hills Track in Chin State of Burma.

References
Rock Art and Artisans in the Lemro Valley

External links
Photographs
Wikimapia

Rivers of Myanmar